Things We Do for Love may refer to:

Music
 The Things We Do for Love, a 2011 album by Joanna Wang
 "The Things We Do for Love" (song), a 1976 song by 10cc
 "Things We Do for Love", a song by Horace Brown 
 "Things We Do for Love", a song by Ta-da from the 2009 film Spectacular!
 Things We Do for Love (The Sounds album) by The Sounds (2020)

Television series
 Things We Do for Love (Ghanaian TV series)
 The Things We Do for Love, a 2015 TV sitcom series on Urban Movie Channel, with lead roles for Darren (Alfonso Ribeiro) and Lourdes (Tamera Mowry-Housley), and supporting roles for James Avery and Maria Conchita Alonso

Television episodes
 "The Things We Do for Love" (All Saints)
 "The Things We Do for Love" (Ballykissangel)
 "The Things We Do for Love" (Beverly Hills, 90210)
 "The Things We Do for Love" (Casualty)
 "The Things We Do for Love" (Chicago Hope)
 "The Things We Do for Love" (Life on a Stick)
 "The Things We Do for Love" (McLeod's Daughters)
 "The Things We Do for Love" (A Touch of Frost)

Theatre
 Things We Do for Love (play), a 1997 play by Alan Ayckbourn